Ships in Harbour, Evening (German - Schiffe im Hafen am Abend) is an 1828 oil on canvas painting by the German artist Caspar David Friedrich, now in the Galerie Neue Meister in Dresden.

See also
List of works by Caspar David Friedrich

References

External links

1828 paintings
Paintings in the Galerie Neue Meister
Paintings by Caspar David Friedrich
Maritime paintings